The Exchange Bank building, formerly the Lion Oil Headquarters, is a historic commercial building at Washington and Oak Streets in El Dorado, Arkansas.  Built in 1926–27, the nine story building was the first skyscraper in Union County, and it was the tallest building in El Dorado at the time of its listing on the National Register of Historic Places in 1986.  It was designed by the Little Rock firm of Mann & Stern, and is an eclectic mix of Venetian-inspired Revival styles.  It was built during El Dorado's oil boom, and housed the headquarters of Lion Oil.  It was included in the El Dorado Commercial Historic District in 2003.

See also
National Register of Historic Places listings in Union County, Arkansas

References

Bank buildings on the National Register of Historic Places in Arkansas
Neoclassical architecture in Arkansas
Office buildings completed in 1927
Buildings and structures in El Dorado, Arkansas
Individually listed contributing properties to historic districts on the National Register in Arkansas
National Register of Historic Places in Union County, Arkansas
Office buildings on the National Register of Historic Places in Arkansas
Oil company headquarters in the United States
Petroleum in Arkansas
Italian Renaissance Revival architecture in the United States
1927 establishments in Arkansas